Leydi Yesenia Solís Arboleda (born 17 February 1990) is a Colombian weightlifter. She won a gold medal at the 2007 Pan American Games for her native South American country, and carried the flag at the opening ceremony. Solís represented Colombia at the 2008 Summer Olympics in Beijing, PR China, finishing in fourth place in her weight division. She won the – 69 kg gold medal in snatch and clean & jerk during the 2014 Pan American Sports Festival.

2008 Summer Olympics performance
Solís won a silver medal at the 2008 Summer Olympic Games behind Rusia's Oxana Slivenko. Solís lifted 105 kg and took the silver medal with a total weight of 240 kg.

References

External links
 
 
 

1990 births
Living people
Sportspeople from Valle del Cauca Department
Olympic weightlifters of Colombia
Olympic silver medalists for Colombia
Weightlifters at the 2007 Pan American Games
Weightlifters at the 2008 Summer Olympics
Weightlifters at the 2016 Summer Olympics
Colombian female weightlifters
Weightlifters at the 2015 Pan American Games
Pan American Games gold medalists for Colombia
Female powerlifters
Pan American Games medalists in weightlifting
Central American and Caribbean Games silver medalists for Colombia
Competitors at the 2006 Central American and Caribbean Games
World Weightlifting Championships medalists
South American Games gold medalists for Colombia
South American Games medalists in weightlifting
Competitors at the 2010 South American Games
Weightlifters at the 2019 Pan American Games
Central American and Caribbean Games medalists in weightlifting
Medalists at the 2007 Pan American Games
Medalists at the 2015 Pan American Games
Olympic medalists in weightlifting
Medalists at the 2008 Summer Olympics
Pan American Weightlifting Championships medalists
21st-century Colombian women